Over the Fence is a 1917 American short comedy film directed by and starring Harold Lloyd. The film is notable as the debut of Lloyd's "Glasses" or "Boy" character. Prints of the film survive at the film archive of the Museum of Modern Art.

Plot
Ginger, a tailor, finds two tickets to a baseball game in the pocket of a customer's garment.  He calls his girlfriend to tell her to meet him at the ballpark.  Ginger is unaware that a fellow tailor, Snitch, sneakily lifted the tickets from his pocket.  When Ginger and his girl arrive at the ballpark for the game, Ginger realizes the tickets are gone.  He has no money, so his attempt to buy tickets proves fruitless.  Snitch sees Ginger's girl and takes her into the ballpark with him using the tickets he stole.  Ginger manages to enter the ballpark using the players' entrance where he mistaken for the home team's new "fuzzball" pitcher. He stars in the game and is on his way to completing a game-winning home run when he sees his girl with Snitch in field-level seats.  A major fight breaks out that involves members of both teams.

Cast
 Harold Lloyd as Ginger, a tailor
 Snub Pollard as Snitch, another
 Bud Jamison as The Boss
 Bebe Daniels as Ginger's girl
 J. Darcie 'Foxy' Lloyd as Umpire (as James Darsie Lloyd)
 Sammy Brooks
 Margaret Joslin (as Margaret Joslin Todd)
 Gus Leonard as Gus
 Fred C. Newmeyer
 Dorothea Wolbert

See also
 Harold Lloyd filmography

References

External links

 Over the Fence on YouTube

1917 films
American silent short films
1917 comedy films
1917 short films
American black-and-white films
Films directed by Harold Lloyd
Films directed by J. Farrell MacDonald
Silent American comedy films
American comedy short films
1910s American films
1910s English-language films